Peipsiääre Parish is a rural municipality in Tartu County, Estonia.

Settlements
Towns
Kallaste

Small boroughs
Kasepää - Kolkja - Varnja

Villages
Savka - Sipelga

Religion

Gallery

References

External links

 
Municipalities of Estonia
Populated places in Tartu County